Phostria schediusalis is a moth in the family Crambidae. It was described by Francis Walker in 1859. It is found on Borneo and in India.

References

Phostria
Moths described in 1859
Moths of Borneo
Moths of Asia